Saint Francis Catholic Academy is a private, Roman Catholic high school in Gainesville, Florida.  It is located in the Roman Catholic Diocese of St. Augustine.

History
In 1999, the Dioceses High School Task Force found room for expansion in the Gainesville area, and so St. Francis Catholic High School opened on August 16, 2004, to serve the growing population. In 2016, St. Francis dropped the "high school" moniker and changed its name to Saint Francis Catholic Academy.

Notes and references

External links
 School Website

Catholic secondary schools in Florida
Education in Gainesville, Florida
Educational institutions established in 2004
High schools in Alachua County, Florida
Roman Catholic Diocese of Saint Augustine
2004 establishments in Florida